The 2006 Kensington and Chelsea Borough Council election took place on 4 May 2006 to elect members of Kensington and Chelsea London Borough Council in London, England. The whole council was up for election and the Conservative Party stayed in overall control.

Election result

Ward results

References

2006 London Borough council elections
2006
21st century in the Royal Borough of Kensington and Chelsea